Alexandros Rizos Rangavis or Alexander Rizos Rakgabis (27 December 180928 June 1892), was a Greek man of letters, poet and statesman.

Early life 
He was born in Constantinople to a Greek Phanariot family. He was educated at Odessa and the military school at Munich. Having served as an officer of artillery in the Bavarian army, he returned to Greece, where he held several high educational and administrative appointments. He subsequently became ambassador to Washington, D.C. (1867), Paris (1868), and Berlin (1874–1886), and was one of the Greek plenipotentiaries at the Congress of Berlin in 1878.

Literary work 
He was the chief representative of a school of literary men, known as the First Athenian School, whose object was to restore as far as possible the ancient classical language. He was also a founding member of the Archaeological Society of Athens.

Of his various works, Hellenic Antiquities (1842–1855, of great value for epigraphical purposes), Archaeologia (1865–1866), an illustrated Archaeological Lexicon (1888–1891), and the first History of Modern Greek Literature (1877) are of the most interest to scholars. He wrote also the following dramatic pieces: The Wedding of Koutroulis (comedy), Dukas (tragedy), The Thirty Tyrants, The Eve (of the Greek revolution); the romances, The Prince of Morea, Leila, and The Notary of Argostoli; and translated portions of Dante, Schiller, Lessing, Goethe and Shakespeare.

After his recall he lived in Athens, where he died on 28 June 1892. He had married Caroline, the daughter of James Skene of Rubislaw, near Aberdeen.

A complete edition of his philological works in nineteen volumes was published at Athens (1874–1890), and his Memoirs appeared posthumously in 1894–1895.

See also
 Modern Greek literature
 Black is the Night
 First Athenian School
 Katharevousa

Notes

External links

 
 
 Entry on Alexandros Rizos Rangavis at WikiMedia Commons

1809 births
1892 deaths
Ambassadors of Greece to the United States
Ambassadors of Greece to France
Ambassadors of Greece to Germany
Greek dramatists and playwrights
Modern Greek poets
First Athenian School
Foreign ministers of Greece
Constantinopolitan Greeks
19th-century Greek poets
19th-century Greek dramatists and playwrights
Burials at the First Cemetery of Athens
Writers from Istanbul
People from Brașov
People from Odesa
People from Munich